Football Club de Guichen is a football club based in Guichen, France. As of the 2021–22 season, it competes in the Régional 1, the sixth tier of the French football league system. The team plays its home games at the Stade Charles Gautier. Red and white are the club colours.

History 
FC Guichen was founded in 1959. In 2017, the club was promoted to the Championnat National 3 for the first time in its history. In 2018, a relegation back to the Régional 1 was followed by promotion back to the National 3 in 2019. In the 2019–20 season, Guichen was once again relegated from the National 3.

In the 2020–21 Coupe de France, Guichen reached the round of 64, where they lost 1–0 to Saumur.

References 

Sport in Ille-et-Vilaine
Association football clubs established in 1959
1959 establishments in France
Football clubs in Brittany